All India Bank Officers’ Confederation (AIBOC), founded on 6 October 1985, is one of the prominent trade union organisations of India. It is an apex body consisting of trade union organisations of supervisory staff members of many banking companies operating in India. AIBOC represents around 325000 supervisory staff members working in different banks in India, and has its registered office at New Delhi, with offices in many cities of India.Current General Secretary of AIBOC is Comrade Rupam Roy.

References

External links
Official website

Trade unions in India
Finance sector trade unions of India
Trade unions established in 1985
Organisations based in Delhi
1985 establishments in Delhi